Venom is the fifth studio album by American rapper and Wu-Tang Clan member U-God released on March 30, 2018 via Babygrande Records. The album was produced by several hip hop producers, including DJ Green Lantern, DJ Homicide, Large Professor and Lord Finesse among others, and also features guest appearances from Inspectah Deck, Method Man, Raekwon, Scotty Wotty and Nomdiq.

Along with the album, U-God released his autobiographical book entitled Raw: My Journey Into The Wu-Tang in which he talks about his early childhood until his music career.

Track listing

References 

2018 albums
U-God albums
Babygrande Records albums
Albums produced by Lord Finesse
Albums produced by Large Professor
Albums produced by DJ Green Lantern